Lagarto (Spanish and Portuguese for 'lizard') or Lagartos may refer to:

Places
 Lagarto, Sergipe, a city in Sergipe state of Brazil
 Lagartos, a municipality located in the province of Palencia, Castile and León, Spain
 Lagarto River, Costa Rica
 Lagarto (crater), Mars

People
 António Lagarto, Portuguese set and costume designer and artist
 Jacob Lagarto, seventeenth century South-American rabbi and Talmudist
 Lúcio Rodrigues (born 1980), Brazilian jiu-jitsu black belt and MMA fighter nicknamed "Lagarto"
 Lagarto (footballer) (1896-unknown), Severino Franco da Silva, Brazilian footballer

Other uses
 USS Lagarto (SS-371), US World War II submarine
 Operation Lagarto, a failed Australian Second World War commando operation in Japanese-held Timor
 Macroscincus, a species of lizard otherwise known as lagarto
 Lagarto Futebol Clube, a Brazilian football club
 Lagartos FC, a Guinea-Bissauan football club
 El Lagarto, the hydroplane which won the APBA Gold Cup from 1933 to 1935

See also
Pedro de Lagarto (c. 1465-1543), Spanish singer and composer
Lagartos de Tabasco, a Mexican football club